The Jāmeh Mosque of Ferdows ( – Masjid-e-Jāmeh Toon/Ferdows) is the grand, congregational mosque (Jāmeh) of Ferdows, South Khorasan Province, Iran. The mosque is located towards the southwest of city, in the center of the ancient city of Toon.

History
It is mostly believed that this mosque was built during Seljuk dynasty, in the 11th century, but some researchers believe that it was constructed in the 7th century.

See also
 List of mosques in Iran

References

External links 

Some Images from Ferdows Congregation Mosque
Ferdows pictures

Mosques in Iran
Buildings and structures in South Khorasan Province
Ferdows
Tourist attractions in Ferdows County
Tourist attractions in South Khorasan Province
11th-century mosques
National works of Iran
Ferdows